Kaguya was a mouse that had two parents of the same sex.  She was named after a Japanese folk tale, in which the Moon-born princess Kaguya (Kaguya-hime) is found as a baby inside a bamboo stalk.

The process of parthenogenesis

A process called haploidisation is used to remove one of the two sets of chromosomes from some cells, leaving them with only one, just like normal gametes. The researchers led by Tomohiro Kono at the Tokyo University of Agriculture used cells from two different female mice and combined them to make a single unique animal. Normally this would not be possible due to genetic imprinting requiring genes inherited from the father for normal placental development. They were able to succeed by using one egg from an immature parent, thus reducing maternal imprinting, and modifying it to express the gene Igf2, which is normally only expressed by the paternal copy of the gene.  Even with this, only two of 457 eggs developed to maturity.

Not a clone
This is not a cloned animal because cells from two individuals were used.  The research refers to the process as parthenogenesis.  "The goal of our study was to discover why sperm and eggs were required for development in mammals", Kono said.

Kaguya the mouse later gave birth to conventionally fathered offspring.

References

External links
NewScientist story on Kaguya
National Geographic story on Kaguya

Individual mice
Individual animals in Japan
Laboratory mice